No. 13 – A Dancing Van Gogh is the thirteenth studio album by Singaporean singer Stefanie Sun, released on 9 November 2017 by Universal Music Taiwan.

Track listing 
 風衣 Windbreaker
 我很愉快 A State of Bliss
 跳舞的梵谷 A Dancing Van Gogh
 天越亮，夜越黑 Daybreak
 天天年年 A Day; A Year
 漂浮群島 Levitate
 超人類 An Interval
 充氧期 Refuel and Rewind
 平日快樂 The Pursuit of Contentment
 極美 Immense Beauty

References 

2017 albums
Stefanie Sun albums